Vyacheslav Melnikov (born 1931) is a Soviet alpine skier. He competed in the men's slalom at the 1956 Winter Olympics.

References

External links
 

1931 births
Possibly living people
Soviet male alpine skiers
Olympic alpine skiers of the Soviet Union
Alpine skiers at the 1956 Winter Olympics
Sportspeople from Kirov, Kirov Oblast